David Mena (born 8 April 1953) is an Israeli lawyer and former member of the Knesset.

Biography
Mena was born in Or Yehuda, Israel in 1953. He served in the Israel Defense Forces and later studied law at Tel Aviv University and was certified as a lawyer. He is also a graduate of criminology and international relations studies at Bar-Ilan University and of social services' management at Brandeis University.

Between the years 1978 and 1987, Mena was a member of Ramat Gan local council. He was also a member of the Israel Broadcasting Authority's plenum from 1984 until 1988. In 1992 he was elected to the thirteenth Knesset on behalf of the Likud party, serving on the House Committee, Labor and Welfare Committee and the Committee on Drug Abuse. Mena was also the chairperson of the parliamentary inquiry committee regarding the Bedouin sector in Israel. He lost his seat in the 1996 elections, and returned to his law practice.

For the 2003 elections he was placed 43rd on the Likud list. Although the party won 38 seats, he re-entered the Knesset on 5 January 2006 as a replacement for Omri Sharon. He lost his seat again in the 2006 elections.

Mena resides in Ramat Gan.

External links

1953 births
People from Or Yehuda
Tel Aviv University alumni
Bar-Ilan University alumni
Israeli lawyers
Living people
Likud politicians
Members of the 13th Knesset (1992–1996)
Members of the 16th Knesset (2003–2006)